Treadwell Gibbons (born 10 December 1985) is a Bermudian cricketer, who has played in two One Day Internationals with the Bermudian cricket team. He also represented them at the 2006 ICC Americas Championship.

External links
 

1985 births
Living people
Bermudian cricketers
Bermuda One Day International cricketers